Floreana Island (Spanish: Isla Floreana) is an island of the Galápagos Islands. It was named after Juan José Flores, the first president of Ecuador, during whose administration the government of Ecuador took possession of the archipelago. It was previously called Charles Island (after King Charles II of England), and Santa María after one of the caravels of Columbus.

It was formed by volcanic eruption.

History
Since the 19th century, whalers kept a wooden barrel at Post Office Bay, so that mail could be picked up and delivered to their destination by ships on their way home, mainly to Europe and the United States. Cards and letters are still placed in the barrel without any postage. Visitors sift through the letters and cards in order to deliver them by hand.

Due to its relatively flat surface, supply of fresh water as well as plants and animals, Floreana was a favorite stop for whalers and other visitors to the Galápagos. When still known as Charles Island in 1820, the island was set alight as a result of a prank gone wrong by helmsman Thomas Chappel from the Nantucket whaling ship the Essex. Being at the height of the dry season, Chappel's fire soon burned out of control and swept the island. The next day saw the island still burning as the ship sailed for the offshore grounds and after a full day of sailing the fire was still visible on the horizon.  Many years later Thomas Nickerson, who had been a cabin boy on the Essex, returned to Charles Island and found a black wasteland: "neither trees, shrubbery, nor grass have since appeared." It is believed the fire contributed to the extinction of some species originally on the island.

In September 1835 the second voyage of HMS Beagle brought Charles Darwin to Charles Island. The ship's crew was greeted by Nicholas Lawson, acting for the Governor of Galápagos, and at the prison colony Darwin was told that tortoises differed in the shape of the shells from island to island, but this was not obvious on the islands he visited and he did not bother collecting their shells. He industriously collected all the animals and plants, and speculated about finding "from future comparison to what district or 'centre of creation' the organized beings of this archipelago must be attached."

On 8 April 1888 , a Navy-manned research vessel assigned to the United States Fish Commission, visited Floreana Island during a 2-week survey of the islands. 

In 1929, Friedrich Ritter and Dore Strauch arrived in Guayaquil from Berlin to settle on Floreana, and sent letters back that were widely reported in the press, encouraging others to follow. In 1932 Heinz and Margret Wittmer arrived with their son Harry from Germany, and shortly afterwards their son Rolf was born there, the first citizen of the island known to have been born in the Galápagos. Later in 1932, the Austrian self-described "Baroness" von Wagner Bosquet arrived with two German companions, Robert Philippson and Rudolph Lorenz, as well Ecuadorian guide Manuel Valdivieso Borja, but a series of strange disappearances and deaths (including possible murders) and the departure of Strauch left the Wittmers as the sole remaining inhabitants of the group who had settled there. They set up a hotel which is still managed by their descendants, and Mrs. Wittmer wrote an account of her experiences in her book Floreana: A Woman's Pilgrimage to the Galápagos. While residing in Tahiti in 1935, Georges Simenon wrote a novel, Ceux de la soif, which recounts these events in fictionalized form. The story was first published as a feuilleton in the newspaper Le Soir between 12 December 1936 and 1 January 1937, and as a novel by Gallimard in 1938. Simenon´s novel was adapted for television in 1989, by Laurent Heynemann. A documentary film recounting these events, The Galapagos Affair, was released in 2013.

The demands of these visitors, early settlers, and introduced species devastated much of the local wildlife with the endemic Floreana tortoise being declared extinct and the endemic Floreana mockingbird becoming extirpated on the island (the few remaining are found on the nearby islands of Gardiner and Champion).

When Charles Darwin visited the island in 1835, he found no sign of its native tortoise and assumed that whalers, pirates, and human settlers had wiped them out. Since about 1850, no tortoises have been found on the island (except for one or two introduced animals kept as pets by the locals), and the International Union for Conservation of Nature classified the Floreana tortoise (Chelonoidis elephantopus sometimes called Chelonoidis nigra) as extinct. However, it may be that there are pure Floreana tortoises living on other islands in the archipelago.

Geology
Isla Floreana is a shield volcano, which has erupted alkaline basalts since 1.5 Ma.  It is the southernmost island in the Galapagos Archipelago, and a 3,400 m submarine escarpment 10 km south of the island forms the southern boundary of the Galapagos Platform.  There are over 50 scoria cones onshore and 6 tuff cones offshore.  Mostly composed of tephra, these cones are the origin of the A'a lava flows.  The oldest flows are on the northern end of the island, while the youngest (26 ka) are on the southern end. Cerro Pajas, the tallest inactive volcano on the island, is the origin of the largest lava flow (272 ka).

Important Bird Area
The island has been recognised as an Important Bird Area (IBA) by BirdLife International. It supports one of the main colonies of critically endangered Galápagos petrels in the archipelago, with about 350 nests scattered beneath a dense vegetation among the rocks. Medium tree finches are endemic to the island. Other significant species include lava gulls and Galapagos penguins.

Points of interest
 A favorite dive and snorkeling site, “Devil's Crown”, located off the northeast point of the island, is an underwater volcanic cone, offering the opportunity to snorkel with schools of fish, sea turtles, sharks and sea lions, which are abundant amongst the many coral formations found here.
 At Punta Cormorant, there is a green olivine beach to see sea lions and a short walk past a lagoon to see flamingos, rays, sea turtles, and Grapsus grapsus (Sally Lightfoot) crabs. Pink flamingos and green sea turtles nest from December to May on this island. The "joint footed" petrel is found here, a nocturnal sea bird which spends most of its life away from land.
 Post Office Bay provides visitors the opportunity to send post cards home without a stamp via the over 200-year-old post barrel and other travelers.
 A miniature football (soccer) field, complete with goals, at the end of Post Office Bay, is used by tour boat crews and their tourists.

Gallery

Bibliography
 
 
 
 Egnal, George (2013). Frederick Ritter My Evil Paradise Floreana (Amazon Kindle Ebook)
 Sinep, Peter (2013). The Queen of Floreana (Amazon Kindle Ebook)

References

External links 

 Floreana

Islands of the Galápagos Islands
Important Bird Areas of the Galápagos Islands
Seabird colonies
Penguin colonies
Island restoration